Froggattisca radiostriata is a species of cave-dwelling antlion (or Myrmeleontidae), endemic to  Queensland and Western Australia. 

The species was first described in 1985 by Tim New.

Miller and Stange describe this species (and all Froggattisca species) as not being a true cave-dwelling antlion, because  not all life stages are confined to caves.

References

Myrmeleontidae
Insects described in 1985